Jim Butterworth may refer to:

 Jim Butterworth (entrepreneur), American technology entrepreneur and documentary filmmaker
 Jim Butterworth (politician), Habersham County Georgia Commission Chairman and State Senator